Echinopsis chiloensis is a species of cactus native to South America; genus members are known as hedgehog cacti, sea-urchin cactus or Easter lily cactus.

Description
This species, E chiloensis, is tree-like with branching structures, straight, vigorous and up to 8 meters long. The shoots are cylindrical, 10 to 12 cm in diameter, and have 16 to 17 mostly low and wide ribs, usually low and wide. The glochids have bright yellow spines that later turn gray. The central spine is straight and is 4-7 (rarely up to 20) cm long. The radial spines of lateral emission are 8 to 12, and measure 1 to 2 cm or more. The funnel-shaped flowers are white and open during the day. They are up to 14 cm long. The fruits are spherical, green and edible. An example occurrence is within the La Campana National Park in Chile.

Distribution
Echinopsis chiloensis is found from the north to the south of central Chile, where it grows in coastal areas as well as in valleys and foothills of the Andes at elevations up to 1800 meters. The species was first described as Cactus chiloensis and published in 1826 by Luigi Colla. After several recombinations, Heimo Friedrich and Gordon Douglas Rowley placed it in the genus Echinopsis in 1974.

References

 Edward F. Anderson. 2001. The cactus family, Timber Press, 776 pages
 C. Michael Hogan. 2008. Chilean Wine Palm: Jubaea chilensis, GlobalTwitcher.com, ed. N. Stromberg 

chiloensis
Cacti of South America
Flora of Chile